Sukilumba Airport , also known as Ilam Airport,  is a domestic airport located in Ilam serving Ilam District, a district in Province No. 1 in Nepal. Flight time from Kathmandu to Sukilumba Airport is about one hour.

History
According to The Rising Nepal, constructions on the airport first began in 2011. In February of 2015, construction ground to a halt as the project ranout of funds. In 2018, the first test flight landed at the airport. However, due to insufficient funds, the further construction of the airport was delayed. In 2021, Civil Aviation Authority of Nepal deemed the airport to be ready for operation. At the time of opening, the airport is served without a terminal building. Another test flight by Nepal Airlines was carried out on 9 February 2022. The airport was opened on 13 February 2022 with flights by Tara Air, whereas Nepal Airlines planned to operate flights but these plans did not yet materialize.

Facilities

Airlines and destinations

See also
List of airports in Nepal

References

Airports in Nepal
Buildings and structures in Koshi Province
Buildings and structures in Ilam District
Airports established in 2022
2022 establishments in Nepal